Dominic J. Squatrito (April 9, 1938 – January 20, 2021) was a United States district judge of the United States District Court for the District of Connecticut from 1994 to 2004.

Education and career
Born in Hartford, Connecticut, Squatrito received a Bachelor of Arts degree from Wesleyan University in 1961 and a Bachelor of Laws from Yale Law School in 1965. He was a Fulbright scholar to the University of Florence, Florence, Italy in 1962. He was in private practice of law in Manchester, Connecticut from 1966 to 1994, and was a counsel to the Town of Manchester Housing Authority from 1972 to 1979, and to the Connecticut State Legislature Judiciary Committee from 1974 to 1975. He was a clerk for the Connecticut State Committee on Executive Nominations from 1974 to 1978, and chief counsel of the Connecticut Senate from 1976 to 1980.

Federal judicial service
On July 28, 1994, Squatrito was nominated by President Bill Clinton to a new seat on the United States District Court for the District of Connecticut created by 104 Stat. 5089. He was confirmed by the United States Senate on October 6, 1994, and received his commission the following day. He assumed senior status on November 1, 2004 due to a certified disability.

He died on January 20, 2021, at age 82, in Manchester, Connecticut.

References

Sources

1938 births
2021 deaths
Wesleyan University alumni
Judges of the United States District Court for the District of Connecticut
United States district court judges appointed by Bill Clinton
Lawyers from Hartford, Connecticut
American people of Italian descent
20th-century American judges
21st-century American judges
Yale Law School alumni